is a Japanese tarento and impressionist (monomane tarento) who has appeared in a number of television programmes and feature films. Fukuda is represented with Amuse, Inc.

Education
Fukuda graduated from Toyota City Late Field Junior High School and Aichi Prefectural Toyono High School.

Impressions

Filmography

TV series

TV drama

Radio

Films

Stage

Music videos

Voice acting

Notes

References

External links
 
 

Japanese impressionists (entertainers)
1988 births
Living people
People from Toyota, Aichi
Amuse Inc. talents